Lasley is a surname. Notable people with the surname include:

Bill Lasley (1902–1990), American baseball player
Cameron Lasley (born 1982), American rapper
David Lasley (1947-2021), American singer-songwriter
Keith Lasley (born 1979), Scottish football player
Jordan Lasley (born 1996), American football player